Schatzberg (German for "treasure mountain") may refer to:

The Schatzberg, a 6,000 ft mountain in the Alps in Austria.

Surnames:
Jerry Schatzberg
Steve Schatzberg

See also
Treasure Mountain (disambiguation)